Johann (Nepomuk) Aloys Miksch (19 July 1765 – 24 September 1845); sometimes spelled Mie(c)ksch or Johannes) was a Bohemian singer, (tenor) and singing teacher.

Life 
Born in St. Georgenthal in Bohemia, in 1777 Miksch became boys' choir of the Dresden court chapel, where he received lessons in singing as well as on the piano and organ. He received his first piano and singing lessons from his father, a cantor and organist in St. Georgenthal. Miksch also studied composition under the Kapellmeister Schuster and in 1783 found employment with the Catholic court church music as a baritone. At the age of 20, he made his first appearance as an opera singer in Dresden. In 1786, he became a ceremonial singer at the Katholische Hofkirche. In 1797, he became tenor of the Italian Opera in Dresden.

After he had become vocally ill due to incorrect voice training, he took singing lessons with the church singer and castrato Vincenzo Caselli. Inspired by him, he now devoted himself exclusively to the study of artistic singing and learned the method followed there under the guidance of Caselli, a pupil of the Bolognese school of Antonio Bernacchi.

In the years 1797-1801, he sang at the Italian Opera in Dresden and from 1801 was singing teacher of the Hofkapellknaben, where he was appointed instructor.

In 1820, at the instigation of Carl Maria von Weber, he became choral director of the Dresdner Hofoper under Weber, and in 1824 also curator of the royal (private) music collection of King Friedrich August II. He retired in 1831. Diary entries by Clara Wieck, who received some singing lessons from Miksch in 1834, provide an interesting insight into his teaching methods. Stuttgart court pianist Anna Sick also studied with him.

Miksch has the merit of having preserved the traditions of older Italian art song in Germany. He also owes his high reputation as a singing teacher to numerous students, among them Johann Gottfried Bergmann, the later singing teacher Ferdinand Sieber and the singers Wilhelmine Schröder-Devrient, Agnese Schebest, Friederike Funk and Henriette Grabau-Bünau.

He was a member of the Dresden masonic lodge Zu den drey Schwerdtern und wahren Freunden.
Miksch's brother, Adalbert Alexius Miksch (1776-1814), was a horn player in the Dresden court orchestra and married the opera singer Maria Camilla Angiolini (1789-1824). The soprano was engaged at the Dresden Court Opera from 1816 until her death.

Mikschs died in Dresden at the age of 80.

Further reading 
(chronological)

 Obituary inn Wiener allgemeine Musik-Zeitung 30 April 1846, pp. 206f. (Numerized).
 Heinrich Ferdinand Mannstein: Denkwürdigkeiten der churfürstlichen und königlichen Hofmusik zu Dresden im 18. und 19. Jahrhundert: Nach geheimen Papieren und Mittheilungen. Enthaltend: Lebensbilder von Joh. Mieksch und seinen Schülern: Alphonso Zesi, Bergmann, Schröder-Devrient, Agnes Schebest, Naumann, Carl Maria v. Weber, Morlacchi, Benelli etc. Heinrich Mattes, Leipzig 1863 MDZ Reader.
 Ferdinand Sieber: Johannes Miksch. Ein Blatt der Erinnerung. In Illustrirte Zeitung, vol. 45 (1865),  (Numerized).
 Constantin von Wurzbach: Miksch, Johann Alois. In Biographisches Lexikon des Kaiserthums Oesterreich 18. Theil. Kaiserlich-königliche Hof- und Staatsdruckerei, Vienna 1868,  (Numerized
 
 Meyers Konversationslexikon, vol. 11, Verlag des Bibliographischen Instituts, Leipzig and Vienna, fourth edition, 1885–1892.
 Adolph Kohut: Der größte deutsche Singemeister. In Neue Zeitschrift für Musik, 17 October 1888, pp. 451f. (Numerized) sowie vom 24. Oktober 1888, pp. 463f. (Numerized).
 Adolph Kohut: Johannes Miksch, der größte deutsche Singemeister und sein Gesangssystem. Vom Atmen. Carl Rühles Musik-Verlag (vormals J. P.Tonger) [1890].
 
 
 Karl-Josef Kutsch and Leo Riemens: Großes Sängerlexikon, 5th vol., 4th, revised and updated ed., Munich 2003, 
 Eberhard Steindorf: Die Konzerttätigkeit der Königlichen musikalischen Kapelle zu Dresden (1817–1858). Institutionsgeschichtliche Studie und Dokumentation (Dresdner Schriften zur Musik 11), Baden-Baden 2018.
Clara Wieck. Jugendtagebücher 1827‒1840, edited by Gerd Nauhaus and Nancy B. Reich unter Mitarbeit von Kristin R.M. Krahe, Hildesheim 2019, .

References

External links 
 
 Miksch, Johann Alois on BLKÖ
 Miksch Johann Aloys on Operissimo

German tenors
Voice teachers
German Freemasons
1765 births
1845 deaths
People from Děčín District